The 2012 season is the 21st full year of competitive football in the Baltic country as an independent nation.

Matches
All times are Estonian (UTC+2/UTC+3).

Players

Debutants
 Kaarel Kiidron (#228–229, FK Viktoria Žižkov) – started the match against Croatia on 25 May 2012
 Henrik Ojamaa (#228–229, Motherwell F.C.) – started the match against Croatia on 25 May 2012
 Ilja Antonov (#230–232, FC Levadia Tallinn) – started the match against Oman on 8 November 2012 
 Ken Kallaste (#230–232, JK Nõmme Kalju) – started the match against Oman on 8 November 2012
 Karl Mööl (#230–232, FC Flora Tallinn) – started the match against Oman on 8 November 2012
 Andre Frolov (#233, FC Flora Tallinn) – 74th-minute substitute in the match against Oman on 8 November 2012
 Stanislav Pedõk (#234, FC Flora Tallinn) – 76th-minute substitute in the match against Oman on 8 November 2012
National team appearance number and club at the time of debut in brackets.

Notes

References

External links
 All national team games

2012
National
2012 national football team results